The 2017–18 Sydney Thunder Women's season was the third in the team's history. Coached by Joanne Broadbent and captained by Alex Blackwell, the Thunder finished the regular season of WBBL03 in second place. They were subsequently knocked out of the tournament via a 27-run semi-final loss to the Perth Scorchers at Optus Stadium.

Squad
Each WBBL|03 squad featured 15 active players, with an allowance of up to five marquee signings including a maximum of three from overseas. Australian marquees were defined as players who made at least ten limited-overs appearances for the national team in the three years prior to the cut-off date (24 April 2017).

Personnel changes for ahead of the season included:

 Erin Osborne departed the Thunder, joining the Melbourne Stars.
 Lauren Cheatle departed the Thunder, joining the Sydney Sixers.
 New Zealand marquee Rachel Priest joined the Thunder, departing the Melbourne Renegades.
 Claire Koski departed the Thunder, joining the Melbourne Renegades.
 Mikayla Hinkley departed the Thunder, joining the Perth Scorchers.
 Stefanie Daffara departed the Thunder, joining the Hobart Hurricanes.

Changes made during the season included the signing of England marquee Fran Wilson as a replacement player.

The table below lists the Sixers players and their key stats (including runs scored, batting strike rate, wickets taken, economy rate, catches and stumpings) for the season.

Ladder

Fixtures
All times are local time

Regular season

The Scorchers were well poised to chase down their target of 146 until a catch on the boundary by Thunder fielder Lisa Griffith dismissed Nicole Bolton for 71 in the 18th over, leaving the hosts needing 20 runs from the final 14 deliveries. On the last ball of the match, Scorchers batter Mathilda Carmichael was run out by a metre while attempting a game-tying run, therefore securing victory for the Thunder by the narrowest of margins.

Knockout phase

Statistics and awards

 Most runs: Rachael Haynes – 426 (6th in the league)
 Highest score in an innings: Alex Blackwell – 81* (58) vs Perth Scorchers, 8 January 2018
 Most wickets: Nicola Carey, Rene Farrell – 17 each (equal 4th in the league)
 Best bowling figures in an innings: Stafanie Taylor – 4/15 (4 overs) vs Hobart Hurricanes, 30 December 2017
 Most catches (fielder): Naomi Stalenberg – 9 (equal 3rd in the league)
 Player of the Match awards:
 Rachael Haynes – 2
 Samantha Bates, Alex Blackwell, Nicola Carey, Rene Farrell, Rachel Priest, Naomi Stalenberg, Stafanie Taylor, Belinda Vakarewa – 1 each
 Thunder Most Valuable Player: Rachael Haynes
 WBBL|03 Team of the Tournament: Rene Farrell
 WBBL|03 Young Gun Award: Belinda Vakarewa (nominated)

References

2017–18 Women's Big Bash League season by team
Sydney Thunder (WBBL)